Branko Krga (born 18 February 1945) is a retired Serbian military officer, who served as the Chief of the General Staff of the Armed Forces of Serbia and Montenegro from 24 June 2002 to 23 December 2004.

References

Chief of staff of the Military of Serbia and Montenegro
1945 births
Living people
People from Daruvar